Patrick Cargill (3 June 191823 May 1996) was an English actor remembered for his lead role in the British television sitcom Father, Dear Father.

Career
Cargill was born to middle-class parents living in Bexhill-on-Sea, Sussex. After education at Haileybury College, he made his debut in the Bexhill Amateur Theatrical Society. However, he was aiming for a military career and was selected for training at the Royal Military Academy at Sandhurst. Cargill became a commissioned officer in the British Indian Army.

The stage
After the Second World War ended, Cargill returned to Britain to focus on a stage career, and joined Anthony Hawtrey's company at Buxton, Croydon and later the Embassy Theatre at Swiss Cottage in London. He became a supporting player in John Counsell's repertory at Windsor alongside Brenda Bruce and Beryl Reid and scored a huge hit in the revue The World's the Limit, which was seen by the Queen and 26 of her guests one evening. He made his first West End appearance in 1953 in Ian Carmichael's revue High Spirits at the London Hippodrome. He also co-wrote the stage play Ring for Catty, with Jack Beale. The second of the Carry On films, Carry On Nurse, produced in 1959, was based on this play as was the 1962 film Twice Round the Daffodils.

After a number of other West End roles he was cast as Bernard in Boeing Boeing at the Apollo Theatre in 1962. The farce, which was ideal for Cargill, drew the attention of major producers led to him starring in Say Who You Are at Her Majesty's Theatre in 1965 and directing Not Now Darling by Ray Cooney and John Chapman at the Strand Theatre in 1968.

Television
Cargill first came to TV notice when playing Sergeant Cuff in the 1959 series The Moonstone.

In 1960, Cargill played Gestapo agent Herr Grosnitz in the BBC TV series "The Long Way Home". He also performed on several occasions with Tony Hancock, twice in Hancock's final BBC television series, including a role as the doctor who clashes with him in the well-known episode "The Blood Donor" (1961). In 1961–62 he featured as the regular character Miguel Garetta in all 26 episodes of the British spy series Top Secret, and in 1962 he played Herr Straffen in The Last Man Out, a TV series by Shaun Sutton, followed two years later by a major part of an episode of The Avengers TV series. In 1967, he appeared in two episodes of The Prisoner as an unusually cruel and brutal Number Two in "Hammer Into Anvil", and as a colleague from Number Six's pre-Village days in "Many Happy Returns".

Cargill starred in three television series of Feydeau farces, adapted by Ned Sherrin and Caryl Brahms and entitled Ooh! La La! (1968–1973), which were shown on BBC 2. These vignette Feydeau farces were originally intended to provide variety for Parisian audiences who were used to more than one production during an evening's entertainment. The third and final series showcased Feydeau's longer pieces. Brahms and Sherrin turned six of their adaptations into book form, and published it as Ooh! La-La! in 1973, with a dedication: "To Patrick Cargill – First among Farceurs".

In 1968, Cargill starred in Father, Dear Father on ITV (written specifically for him) as Patrick Glover, a thriller writer and an inept father of two teenage daughters, played by Natasha Pyne (Anna) and Ann Holloway (Karen). The show ran until 1973 and was produced and directed by William G. Stewart.

Many performers who had worked before with the actor featured in an entertainment special called Patrick, Dear Patrick, An Evening with Patrick Cargill and His Guests (1972). Cargill was a friend of Patrick Macnee from their early acting days, and Macnee returned from California to make a guest appearance on the show. It included both Patricks singing "Mad Dogs and Englishmen". Cargill's companion, Vernon Page, recounts that at the time of casting Cargill wanted to sing this duet with Sir Noël Coward and even visited him at the hotel in London where he was staying in an attempt to persuade him to appear, but Coward was either unwilling or unable to agree to the request and he died 15 months later. This one-off special production by Thames Television also guest-starred Beryl Reid, with whom Cargill sang the duet "I Remember It Well" by Alan Jay Lerner and Frederick Loewe (from Gigi). Cargill added a new response to the line "We drank champagne" (Cargill's line): "You gave me Coke, you drank the wine yourself, you soak!" (Reid's riposte).

In 1976, Cargill returned to the TV screens with The Many Wives of Patrick, playing a middle-aged playboy and antiques dealer, Patrick Woodford, who is trying to divorce his sixth wife in order to remarry his first. This series showcased many prominent stars such as Patrick Macnee and Dawn Addams. The 1980s was something of a revival for Cargill's natural talent at farce. He co-starred in Key for Two with Moira Lister at the Vaudeville Theatre and then at the Old Vic Theatre in William Douglas-Home's After the Ball is Over. In 1986, he starred with Frankie Howerd in A Funny Thing Happened on the Way to the Forum at the Chichester Festival Theatre, in which he played the part of Senex.

In his final years, Cargill was seen in Captain Beaky at the Playhouse in 1990 and after that he toured in Derek Nimmo's British Airways Playhouse. He also played Neville Chamberlain in the 1990 British Sitcom Heil Honey I'm Home, which was cancelled after one episode. For the centenary staging of Charley's Aunt in 1992, Cargill played the part of the dreaded Spettigue.

Films
His film appearances included An Alligator Named Daisy and Expresso Bongo; two of the Carry On films: Carry On Regardless and Carry On Jack;  Help! (1965) starring The Beatles, The Magic Christian (1969) with Peter Sellers and Ringo Starr and Charlie Chaplin's A Countess from Hong Kong, in which he played the part of the butler, Hudson.

Music
A lesser known detail of Cargill's showbusiness career is the handful of recordings that he made in the 1960s and 1970s. The first was an album called Father, Dear Father (1969) in which Cargill sang a medley of songs. The female voice on the album was not Noel Dyson (Nanny) but that of June Hunt, a friend of Cargill.

He followed this with three singles. One called "Father, Dear Father Christmas" and another called "Thinking Young" and the final single called "Father, Dear Father." None of these recordings were commercially successful.

Cargill appeared as Sir Joseph Porter in H.M.S. Pinafore'' at the Queen Elizabeth Hall in August 1983.

Personal life

From the mid-1960s Cargill lived at Sheen Gate Gardens, Richmond on Thames. He spent his time 'resting' at Spring Cottage, his country retreat situated in Warren Lane, near , East Sussex.

Cargill's private life was little known and his homosexuality was not public for decades. For many years, Cargill's companion was Vernon Page, an eccentric landscape gardener, poet and lampoon songwriter, until he married in 1984 with Cargill's blessing. Cargill was a private man, who did not relish his celebrity status, though he was always kind to fans who approached him. He would shun the awards ceremonies in favour of a quiet evening at home playing mahjong. He never made any public acknowledgment of his private life as he felt that to confirm his homosexuality would damage his professional image. Notwithstanding his reluctance to "come out" in this respect, Cargill was happy in his private life and his wit when not in the spotlight reflected that. Once, whilst lunching with Ray Cooney, the theatrical impresario, Cargill observed, when a particularly handsome waiter mistakenly removed his soup spoon, "Aah, look Ray, the dish has run away with the spoon." In the later years of his life, Cargill lived in Henley-on-Thames with his last companion, James Camille Markowski.

The love of his life was his Bentley, a black and dark green model of which only six were ever made. Cargill also had a Mini and often told a story about driving through Barnes one day and on seeing one of the other five Bentley Drop-Heads at the traffic lights, waved furiously at the driver, only to realise that he was driving his Mini that day. In the mid-1980s he changed the Bentley for a Rolls-Royce.

Cargill's many pets included a monkey, a parrot and a castrated ram. His favourites were Ra, a cross-border collie, and Charles, a cat that lived at Spring Cottage.

Death
At the time of his death at the age of 77, Cargill was suffering from a brain tumour and was being nursed in a hospice in Richmond on Thames, London. In 1995, the year before he died, Cargill had been struck by a car in Australia; though he was only slightly injured, this accident led to false reports that the cause of his death was a hit-and-run accident.

Filmography

References

Sources

External links

 Patrick Cargill Obituary in The Independent  

1918 births
1996 deaths
British Indian Army officers
Deaths from brain cancer in England
English male film actors
English male stage actors
English male television actors
English gay actors
People from Bexhill-on-Sea
English LGBT actors
20th-century English male actors
British male comedy actors
20th-century English LGBT people